Farzar is an American animated sci-fi fantasy sitcom television series created by Waco O'Guin and Roger Black for Netflix. The series premiered on July 15, 2022,  and stars Dana Snyder, Lance Reddick, Grey Griffin, Kari Wahlgren, Carlos Alazraqui, David Kaye, and Jerry Minor.

Premise
Farzar takes place on the planet Farzar, where the son of the villainous czar Renzo (Reddick), Prince Fichael (Snyder), has been placed in charge of the S.H.A.T. Squad. The team—- consisting of him and his crew -- the cyborg Scootie (Minor), conjoined twins Mal and Val Skullcrusher (Wahlgren), and Farzar's top scientist Barry Barris (Kaye) -- leave the protective dome of their city to protect the populace from the evil Bazarack (also Snyder).

Characters

Main
Renzo (voiced by Lance Reddick) – The corrupt and villainous czar of Farzar and the father of Prince Fichael, using various methods to maintain his hold over Farzar from brainwashing propaganda to outright murder. He also seeks to destroy the native residents of Farzar, resulting in his defeat by Fichael in the season 1 finale.
Prince Fichael (voiced by Dana Snyder) – A well-meaning but not-too-bright royal space warrior determined to protect Farzar with the help of his special crew, S.H.A.T., eventually forced to stop Renzo from executing genocide on the planet's native inhabitants.
 Snyder also voices Bazarack Francine Finklestein, an evil alien who is trying to reclaim Farzar from Renzo, and Billy, a patchwork mutant created by Barry Barris from various animal parts who is quite intelligent despite his simple-minded personality.
Queen Flammy (voiced by Grey Griffin) – The mother of Prince Fichael, who spoils him rotten.
Barry Barris (voiced by David Kaye) – An unhinged scientist with constant suicidal tendencies.
 Kaye also voices Clitaris. Bazarack's second in command and voice of reason, and Gorpzorp, Bazarack's scientist who is constantly treated like a dog.
Val and Mal Skullcruncher (voiced by Kari Wahlgren) – Conjoined twin sisters with contrasting personalities: Val being a kind and soft-spoken elementary school teacher while Mal is a grizzled soldier who can be quite overprotective of her twin. The season 1 finale reveals that Val was forced to repress her emotions and be the good twin, ending up a murderous sociopath as she helps Renzo with Mal struggling against her before their body is split apart from a stray beam.
Scootie (voiced by Jerry Minor) – A drug-addicted robot and best friend to Fichael who is a member of S.H.A.T.. Scootie was originally human before a series of mishaps gradually turned him into a cyborg before he becomes a complete robot at the end of the first episode, only keeping his cyborg status by letting Sal live on his body as his taint. He is the Farzar counterpart of Brickleberry main cast member Denzel Jackson.
Zobo (voiced by Carlos Alazraqui) – A chaotic pink bunny-like space alien with electric powers known as a chaos-celot, a species that literally feeds off chaos and misery before potentially unleashing an apocalypse once absorbing enough chaos energy. He makes a cameo appearance in the final season of Paradise PD.
 Alazraqui also voices Sal Skullcruncher, Val and Mal's wisecracking, lesser-known underdeveloped conjoined twin brother who is literally cut off and now serves as Scootie's taint.
Flobby (voiced by Waco O'Guin) – One of the two types of Intellectoid, a member of a race of dim-witted aliens that reproduce through a heavy censored method. He bears the resemblance of Bobby Possumcods from Brickleberry and Robbie Hick from Paradise PD, making cameo appearances in the latter show's final season.
Belzert (voiced by Roger Black) – One of the two types of intellectoid who bears a resemblance of BoDean Lynn from Brickleberry and Delbert Hick from Paradise PD, making cameo appearances in the latter show's final season.

Production

Development
On January 29, 2021 it was announced that Brickleberry and Paradise PD Creators Waco O'Guin and Roger Black had made a multi over deal with Netflix to produce various content for the streaming platform and it's new in-house animation studio Netflix Animation. The animation for the series is done by Bento Box Entertainment. Production on the series began with the first season consisting of ten episodes and with Black and O’Guin serving as showrunners and executive producers for the series, the series would premiere on July 15, 2022.

Casting
Alongside the initial series announcement, it was reported that Lance Reddick, Dana Snyder, Grey Griffin, David Kaye, Kari Wahlgren, Jerry Minor, and Carlos Alazraqui had been cast in series regular roles.

Episodes

Season  1 (2022)

Season  2 (2023)

Release
On June 8, 2022, the first trailer for the series was released alongside the announcement that it would premiere on July 15, 2022. The second season will be aired at July 14th, 2023.

Clint Worthington of RogerEbert.com called it "One of the Worst Animated Shows in Years."

References

External links

2020s American adult animated television series
2020s American animated comedy television series
2020s American police comedy television series
2020s American sitcoms
2020s American comic science fiction television series
2022 American television series debuts
American adult animated comedy television series
American flash adult animated television series
American animated sitcoms
English-language television shows
English-language Netflix original programming
Television series created by Waco O'Guin and Roger Black
Animated television series by Netflix